Dejan Urbanč (born 13 April 1984) is a retired Slovenian footballer who played as a midfielder.

External links

PrvaLiga profile 

1984 births
Living people
People from Brežice
Slovenian footballers
Association football midfielders
NK Celje players
NK Krško players
NK Olimpija Ljubljana (1945–2005) players
Slovenian PrvaLiga players
Slovenia youth international footballers
Slovenia under-21 international footballers